Endocrinology is a peer-reviewed scientific journal published by The Endocrine Society. It is the Society's oldest journal and was established in 1917. It covers research on all aspects of endocrinology, including growth factors, steroids, the thyroid, and physiology. According to the Journal Citation Reports, the journal had a 2021 impact factor of 5.051. Its current editor-in-chief is Dr. Carol A. Lange, a Professor in the Departments of Medicine and Pharmacology at the University of Minnesota Masonic Cancer Center.

References

External links 
 

Publications established in 1917
Endocrinology journals
Monthly journals
English-language journals
Academic journals published by learned and professional societies